The 1st 1921 Lithuanian Athletics Championships were held in Kaunas on 30–31 July 1921. In first championship competed only men.

Winners 
60 m: Steponas Garbačiauskas : 7.6 (NR)
200 m: Steponas Garbačiauskas : 25.2 (NR)
5000 m: L.Juozapaitis : 18:30.0 (NR)
Long jump: V.Vokietaisi : 5 m (NR)
Pole vault : E. Fersteris : 2.40
Discus throw: I. Teršerskis 29.02 (NR)
Javelin throw: Dargužas : 40.57 (NR)
Hammer throw: Kęstutis Bulota: 17,86 (NR)
Triple jump: Kęstutis Bulota: 10.5 (NR)
Shot put : I. Teršerskis : 9,90 m (NR)
4 × 100 m : ?? : ??

References 
Results

External links 
 Lithuanian athletics (old)
 Lithuanian athletics (new)

Lithuanian Athletics Championships
Lithuanian Athletics Championships, 1921
Lithuanian Athletics Championships